Veleno is an album by Italian singer Mina, issued in 2002.

Track listing 

 Succhiando l'uva – 4:09  
 Certe cose si fanno – 3:58  
 D'amore non scrivo più – 3:59  
 Il pazzo – 4:07  
 La seconda da sinistra – 4:32  
 Che fatica – 4:35  
 Notturno delle tre – 4:23  
 Hai vinto tu – 2:35  
 In percentuale – 4:24  
 Solo un attimo – 4:25  
 Mente – 4:15  
 Ecco il domani – 3:31

Musicians

Artist

 Mina – vocal

Arrangement 

 Massimiliano Pani, Nicolò Fragile
 Gianni Ferrio – tracks 3, 5, 6, 7, 11
 Bruno Zucchetti, Alfredo Golino, Giulia Fasolino – tracks 9, 10, 12

Other musicians 

 Alfredo Golino – percussion
 Cesare Chiodo, Faso – bass
 Alex Britti, Giorgio Cocilovo, Gogo Ghidelli, Sandro Gibellini, Toti Panzanelli – acoustic guitar
 Antonio Faraò, Bruno Zucchetti – piano
 Bruno Zucchetti – keyboards
 Massimo Moriconi – contrabass
 Franco Ambrosetti – trumpet and flugelhorn
 Gerges Alvarez – horn
 Nicolò Fragile – hammond organ
 Federico Cicoria – oboe
 Gianni Ferrio – conductor of strings
 Anthony Flint – first violin
 Giulia Fasolino, Massimiliano Pani, Bruno Zucchetti – backing vocals
 Hoang Le – french horn

2002 albums
Mina (Italian singer) albums